Mumtaz Mahal is a 1944 Indian Hindi-language historical epic film, directed by Kidar Nath Sharma and starring Khursheed Bano and Chandra Mohan. Madhubala also stars, in one of her earliest pictures. The film opened to negative reviews due to its distortion of history, but became a commercial success, and the sixth highest grossing Indian film of 1944.

Plot 
Mumtaz Mahal showcases the love story of Mughal emperor Shah Jehan and his favourite wife Mumtaz Mahal, and the former's efforts to create Taj Mahal for housing the tomb of Mahal after her death.

Cast 
Khursheed Bano as Mumtaz Mahal
Chandra Mohan as Shah Jehan
Madhubala as Jahanara Begum (Credited as "Baby Mumtaz)
Kajjan as Noor Jehan 
Rajendra as Lala Yacoob

Production 
Mumtaz Mahal was Madhubala's second film after Basant (1942). It was also her first of the five films she made under Ranjit Movietone as a child artist.

Soundtrack

Release

Critical reception 
Mumtaz Mahal opened to overwhelmingly negative reviews. A review published in Filmindia magazine by Baburao Patel read: "It is difficult to say exactly how bad Mumtaz Mahal is. Stretch your imagination to its widest and see if you can fit in this dirty picture."

An audience named Ammunuddin's reaction to the film was: "[In] Mumtaz Mahal, history has been mercilessly murdered, facts have been deliberately distorted, the story is crudely conceived and the acting and even the music is intensely boring. Historical records reveal that it was during Shah Jehan's time that the Mughal empire was at its height of power. When will our producers and other big guns of the Indian Film Industry put art before Mammon worship?"

Box office 
Nevertheless, Mumtaz Mahal was a commercial success. The film earned an estimated amount of 3.5 million at the box office.

References

External links
 

1944 films
1940s Hindi-language films
Films set in the Mughal Empire
Indian epic films
Indian historical films
Films scored by Vinod
Indian black-and-white films
1940s historical films
Cultural depictions of Shah Jahan
Films directed by Kidar Sharma
Cultural depictions of Indian women